Madden Nation was an American reality television show, created as a joint effort between EA Sports and ESPN Original Entertainment to take viewers inside the world of Madden NFL, a popular video game with over 10 million players worldwide.  The series premiered on December 6, 2005 and is currently off the air.

The eight episode series featured the nation's top Madden NFL gamers—along with real-life NFL player sponsors— playing against each other in elimination-style tournaments.  Throughout the competition, the players traveled across the country in the Madden Nation Bus making their way to New York City for the tournament finals and a chance to win the $100,000 grand prize.  The final game of every season was held in Times Square on the ABC Super Sign.

Coach Cam
Coach Cam is a mechanic used during Madden Nation as a tool to provide insights into the minds of the players.  Before certain plays, the gamers would reveal play selection to the television audience.  Often, this mechanic would set expectations and provide a deeper understanding of the players’ strategies for the viewer.

Season 1
Madden Nation season 1 debuted on December 6, 2005 and ran for 8 episodes.  Rob Taylor, a.k.a. Duka (d. July 2, 2007). defeated Sherman Jameson a.k.a. Sherm Sticky to become the champion of Madden Nation Season 1.

Format
The competition started in San Francisco, California where EA hand picked eight of the country's best Madden 06 players to play for a grand prize of $100,000.  These elite gamers were not alone.  Each one represented an NFL superstar that had their back.  The gamers traveled city to city on a tour bus playing against each other in Madden competitions with two people losing their way into the jeopardy game.  The loser of the jeopardy game must then play a free agent-gamer for the right to remain on the bus.  In the end, the two best gamers of the bus played one game on the big screen in Times Square for $100,000.

Contestants

Season 2
Billy Wolf, a.k.a. Da Secret, defeated Frederick Amponsem, a.k.a. Fred Dizzle, to become the champion of Madden Nation Season 2.

Format
In its second season, Madden Nation once again documented the high drama of eight professional Madden NFL 07 players as they competed for a cash prize of $100,000.  Again, each player represented an NFL superstar, but this time, the gamers began their journey at the EA Sports studios in Orlando.  Unlike last year the contestants were paired in teams and forced to support each other or face elimination.  On the 12-city tour, they battled each other for the right to stay in the game until the ultimate finale in Times Square, New York City.

Contestants

Season 3
Season 3 of Madden Nation began airing on ESPN2 on October 9, 2007 at 11PM ET.  Airing as back-to-back episodes on Tuesdays, the finale, which again took place in New York City's Times Square, was televised Tuesday, Oct. 30, with the Madden Nation winner claiming a $100,000 prize.  Tour stops in season 3 include NFL cities Dallas, Kansas City, St Louis, Chicago, Indianapolis, Cleveland, Buffalo, Boston and New York. The show ended in Times Square in New York. It was between Sirus the Virus, the Rams, and Problem, the Bears. The show finished off with Problem being the victor.

Contestants

Season 4
On Tuesday, September 16, 2008 at 11:00 p.m., ESPN2 began airing the fourth season of Madden Nation, a reality television series in which the country's top 10 Madden NFL 09 players competed in a cross-country elimination tournament on the Xbox 360 console. Gamers represented top NFL athletes and got the chance to meet their respective pro players along the way. The final tournament was played in New York City's Times Square for a grand prize of $100,000 and the ultimate title of the best Madden NFL gamer in the nation.  Young Nephew was the champion after defeating Dynasty in the finals.

Contestants

External links
Official Madden Nation Season 1 Page  at EA Sports
 Official Madden Nation Season 2 Page  at EA Sports
Madden Nation 2007 Page  at ESPN
Madden Nation 4 at ESPN

ESPN original programming
Madden NFL
2000s American reality television series
2005 American television series debuts